Marc Lamont Hill (born December 17, 1978) is an American academic, author, activist, and television personality. He is a professor of media studies and urban education at Temple University in Philadelphia, Pennsylvania.

Hill is the host of UpFront on Al Jazeera English, VH1 Live! on VH1, and Basketball Wives reunion shows. He is also a BET News correspondent. Previously he was the first host of the syndicated television show Our World with Black Enterprise, the host of HuffPost Live, and a political commentator for CNN and Fox News. In November 2018, Hill was fired from his position at CNN after remarks before the United Nations on the Israeli–Palestinian conflict that were alleged to be antisemitic.

Early life and education 
Hill was born and raised in Philadelphia. When he was 14, Hill met future NBA star Kobe Bryant at a basketball summer camp, and the two became close friends and remained so until Bryant's death. After graduating from Carver High School, a public school in Philadelphia, Hill attended Morehouse College, one of the nation’s most selective HBCUs, but he dropped out while still a freshman because, in his words, he was only "hanging out and getting in trouble". He finished his undergraduate studies back home at Temple University, where he received his B.S. in education and Spanish in 2000. He later earned both an M.A. and a Ph.D. from the University of Pennsylvania.

Career 

From 2005 to 2009, Hill was a professor of urban education and American studies at Temple University. In the fall of 2009, Hill joined the faculty of Teachers College, Columbia University as an associate professor of education. He left Teachers College in 2014 to join the faculty at Morehouse College as Distinguished Professor of African American Studies. In May 2017, it was announced that he was re-joining the faculty of Temple University as the Steve Charles Professor of Media, Cities, and Solutions.

Hill worked as a political contributor for Fox News from 2007 until 2009, when he was fired. During this time, he appeared on The O'Reilly Factor, Huckabee, and Hannity. Prior to Fox, Hill was a commentator on CNN and MSNBC, as well as Court TV, where he was a weekly contributor to the Star Jones talk show. In August 2010, he replaced Ed Gordon as host of the syndicated television show Our World with Black Enterprise. In May 2012, he joined Huffington Post as a host of HuffPost Live. In January 2021, Hill was named as the host of UpFront on Al Jazeera English, as the permanent replacement for Mehdi Hasan. In March of the same year he was announced as anchor for Black News Tonight, a primetime show on the Black News Channel which would launch the following month.

Activism 
Hill is a founding board member of My5th, a non-profit organization aiming to educate youth about their legal rights and responsibilities. In 2001, he started a literacy project that uses hip-hop culture to increase school engagement and reading skills among high-school students. He also organizes and teaches adult literacy courses for high school dropouts in Philadelphia and Camden. Hill also works with the ACLU Drug Reform Project, focusing on drug informant policy. Hill was named one of America's top 30 black leaders under the age of 30 by Ebony magazine.

In addition, Hill works with African American and Latino youth. Hill publicly argued for the release of Genarlow Wilson and Shaquanda Cotton. In the Cotton case, Hill organized an internet letter writing campaign. Hill urged the public to write to District Attorney David McDade to express concerns about his desire to appeal the court's decision to void the sentence of Genarlow Wilson. In May 2013, an article by Hill for Ebony.com entitled "Why Aren't We Fighting for CeCe McDonald?" won the GLAAD Media Award for "Outstanding Digital Journalism Article."

On June 12, 2010, Hill alleged that while driving his car, he was unlawfully stopped by two Philadelphia police officers, one of whom was highly regarded at the time—Officer Richard DeCoatsworth. Hill, represented by his brother, attorney Leonard Hill, filed a civil lawsuit on October 12, 2010, against the City of Philadelphia and four police officers, including DeCoatsworth.

Hill expressed support for the Green Party in the 2016 US presidential election. Of candidates Donald Trump and Hillary Clinton, he stated: "I would rather have Trump be president for four years and build a real left-wing movement that can get us what we deserve as a people, than to let Hillary be president and we stay locked in the same space where we don't get what we want."

Controversy

U.N speech on Israel 
On November 28, 2018, while speaking in a meeting at the UN marking the International Day of Solidarity with the Palestinian People, Hill said: "We have an opportunity to not just offer solidarity in words but to commit to political action, grass-roots action, local action and international action that will give us what justice requires and that is a free Palestine from the river to the sea."

The Anti-Defamation League alleged that the phrase "river to the sea" is code, often used by Hamas, for the destruction of Israel.

In November 2018, Hill rejected this characterization, saying this was a "call for justice" referring to the existing borders of the Palestinian territories on the Mediterranean Sea (Gaza) and Jordan River (West Bank). Hill replied, "I support Palestinian freedom. I support Palestinian self-determination. I am deeply critical of Israeli policy and practice. I do not support anti-Semitism, killing Jewish people, or any of the other things attributed to my speech. I have spent my life fighting these things." He also said that the "river to the sea" phrase dates to the early 20th century and "has never been the exclusive province of a particular ideological camp", adding "[t]he idea that this is a Hamas phrase is simply untrue." On December 1, 2018, Hill said that "we must reject anti-Semitism in any form or fashion" and apologized "for the reception of my message". Hill wrote in The Philadelphia Inquirer: "justice will come through a single bi-national democratic state that encompasses Israel, the West Bank, and Gaza."

CNN firing 
Following his comments about Israel before the U.N., Hill's contract with CNN was terminated by the network. This was confirmed on November 29, 2018, when a CNN spokesperson announced that "Marc Lamont Hill is no longer under contract with CNN."

The firing provoked strongly opposing opinions. The move was criticized by pro-Palestinian activists, who accused the network of caving to pressure from pro-Israeli groups. Aymann Ismail of Slate magazine said the decision set a "dangerous precedent" which was "another step toward recasting all speech about Israel’s brutality as anti-Semitism". Glenn Greenwald remarked that Hill's firing "is a major defeat for the right to advocate for Palestinian rights, to freely critique the Israeli government, and for the ability of journalism and public discourse in the U.S. generally to accommodate dissent." Bentley Addison of The Forward argued that advocating for Palestine is not necessarily anti-Semitic but said that "The fact that Hill used the rhetoric of groups that are violently anti-Semitic is a real problem, and the fact that he seems to advocate violent resistance against Israel should give pause to every supporter of a peaceful outcome to the conflict."

The board of trustees of Temple University, Hill's employer, condemned Hill's words saying they included what "many regard as promoting violence", and in regards to the phrase "from the river to the sea" used by Hill, the trustees said that they are "widely perceived as language that threatens the existence of the State of Israel" that "has been used by anti-Israel terror groups". Furthermore, the trustees said that Hill's words were criticized as "virulent anti-Semitism" and "hate speech". However, as Hill was not representing the school and that as a "private individual is entitled to the same Constitutional protection of any other citizen, and that he has through subsequent statements expressly rejected anti-Semitism and anti-Semitic violence", the trustees decided not to dismiss nor discipline Hill.

Louis Farrakhan 
After a meeting with Louis Farrakhan in 2016, Hill said on Instagram: "Been blessed to spend the last day with Minister Louis Farrakhan. An amazing time of learning, listening, laughing, and even head nodding to music. God is Great." The photograph of Hill with Louis Farrakhan, long accused of antisemitism, resurfaced in October 2018. Lamont Hill said at this time that although he disagreed with Farrakhan on some issues, "I will not allow that to be an excuse for allowing dishonest media or poorly intentioned observers to create unnecessary division" adding he would "not be told who to speak to, sit with, or engage." He said he was unaware the image was being used for commercial purposes by the Nation of Islam website and would ask for it to be removed as it was inconsistent with "my values and my professional standards". He said that he did now believe Farrakhan to be an antisemite and was utterly opposed to Farrakhan's then-recent comparison of Jews to termites.

Appearing on The Breakfast Club radio program in December 2018, Hill said that, while he does not agree with Farrakhan on all issues:For some reason, if you meet with Minister Farrakhan and you don’t throw him away wholesale, then you’re castigated in a way that doesn’t happen with anybody else. Why is only one set of people untouchable? And why does every black leader have to ritually denounce Farrakhan in order to sustain a position? That doesn’t happen to anyone else.

Books 
 Hill, Marc Lamont; Brewster, Todd (2022). Seen and Unseen: Technology, Social Media, and the Fight for Racial Justice. Atria Books. 
  
 Hill, Marc Lamont; Barat, Frank (Editor); Taylor, Keeanga-Yamahtta (2020). We Still Here: Pandemic, Policing, Protest, & Possibility. Haymarket Books.

References

External links
 
 
 "CNN commentator calls for elimination of Israel, endorses violent Palestinian ‘resistance’", Washington Examiner

1978 births
Living people
African-American academics
African-American activists
African-American journalists
African-American television personalities
American anti-war activists
American male non-fiction writers
American political activists
American political commentators
American political writers
American social activists
American social commentators
American socialists
American television talk show hosts
American television writers
Al Jazeera people
CNN people
Fox News people
American male television writers
Screenwriters from New York (state)
Screenwriters from Pennsylvania
Teachers College, Columbia University faculty
Temple University alumni
Temple University faculty
University of Pennsylvania alumni
Writers from Philadelphia
African-American screenwriters
21st-century African-American people
20th-century African-American people